Radio Solidarity is the name of a radio show produced by the anarchist Workers Solidarity Movement, based in Ireland. It is broadcast on Near 90fm and podcast globally, covering current issues, politics and struggle in Ireland and further afield.

Radio Solidarity or Radio S was an underground radio station of the Solidarity resistance movement, broadcasting on 70.1MHz FM in Poland in defiance of the censorship from the times of the martial law in Poland to it the fall of the communist regime in the People's Republic of Poland. It was established by Zbigniew Romaszewski.

References

Radio stations in Poland
Solidarity (Polish trade union)
Pirate radio stations
Anti-communism in Poland

Radio stations established in 1982 
Radio stations disestablished in 1989
Defunct mass media in Poland